Tappeh Darab Khan (also Romanized as Tappeh Dārāb Khān; also known as Tappeh Dārkhān) is a village in Dasht-e Zahab Rural District, in the Central District of Sarpol-e Zahab County, Kermanshah Province, Iran. At the 2006 census, its population was 161, in 28 families.

References 

Populated places in Sarpol-e Zahab County